The 2013–14 Primera Divisió is the nineteenth season of top-tier football in Andorra. It began on September 22, 2013, and will end in April 2014. The defending champions are FC Lusitanos, who won their second championship in the previous season.

Stadia and locations

Andorra la Vella teams:FC LusitanosCE Principat

Santa Coloma teams:FC Santa ColomaUE Santa Coloma

Competition format
The participating teams first played a conventional round-robin schedule with every team playing each opponent once "home" and once "away" (in actuality, the designation of home and away was purely arbitrary as the clubs did not have their own grounds) for a total of 14 games. The league was then split up in two groups of four teams with each of them playing teams within their group in a home-and-away cycle of games. The top four teams competed for the championship. The bottom four clubs played for one direct relegation spot and one relegation play-off spot. Records earned in the First Round were taken over to the respective Second Rounds.

Promotion and relegation from 2012–13
UE Engordany were relegated after last season due to finishing in 8th place. They were replaced by Segona Divisió champions FC Ordino.

FC Encamp, who finished last season in 7th place, and 4th place (2nd and 3rd were B teams) Segona Divisió club Atlètic Club d'Escaldes played a two-legged relegation play-off. FC Encamp won the playoff, 8–1 on aggregate, and remained in the Primera Divisió while Atlètic Club d'Escaldes remained in the Segona Divisió.

First round

Second round

Championship round

Relegation round

Relegation play-off
The seventh-placed club in the league will compete in a two-legged relegation play-off against the runners-up of the 2013–14 Segona Divisió, for one spot in 2014–15 Primera Divisió.

Inter Club d'Escaldes won 6-1 on aggregate

Top scorers

References

External links
 Official site  
 Visualització de Partits - Andorran football league tables, records & statistics database. 

Primera Divisió seasons
Andorra
1